The Matanogawa Dam (俣野川ダム) is a concrete gravity dam on a tributary of the Hino River located  south of Kōfu in Tottori Prefecture, Japan. Construction on the dam began in 1978 and it was complete in 1984. The primary purpose of the dam is hydroelectric generation and it creates the lower reservoir for the Matanogawa Pumped Storage Power Station (俣野川発電所). The power station is located on the southern bank of the reservoir and contains four  Francis pump-turbine-generators. To generate power, water from the Doyo Dam is sent to the power station, used to generate electricity and then discharged into the Matanogawa Reservoir. This occurs when energy demand is high and when it is low, water is pumped back up to the Doyo Dam as stored energy. The same pump-generators that pump the water to Doyo reverse and generate electricity when it is sent back down. The first generator was operational in 1992 and the last in 1996.

See also

List of pumped-storage hydroelectric power stations
List of power stations in Japan

References

Dams completed in 1984
Dams in Tottori Prefecture
Gravity dams
Pumped-storage hydroelectric power stations in Japan